Bruno Åkesson (22 January 1887 – 3 February 1971) was a Swedish wrestler. He competed in the featherweight event at the 1912 Summer Olympics.

References

External links
 

1887 births
1971 deaths
Olympic wrestlers of Sweden
Wrestlers at the 1912 Summer Olympics
Swedish male sport wrestlers
Sportspeople from Malmö